The Women's Philippine Basketball League was a semi-professional women's basketball league in the Philippines.

It was originally formed in 1998 as the women's counterpart to the Philippine Basketball League. The league went on hiatus from 2000 until it was revived in 2008. The league was revived by Mikee Romero.

However, the league quickly folded after that season.

The league, at least for the 2008 season, was sanctioned by the Samahang Basketbol ng Pilipinas, the country's national basketball federation.

Ever Bilena team of Dioceldo Sy dominated the league, winning all three seasons.

Teams
Bacchus Energy Drink- St. Scholastica's College
Ever Bilena- University of Santo Tomas
Mail and More- Chiang Kai Shek College
Muscle Tape- Lyceum of the Philippines University Lady Pirates
Nutri-C- Ateneo de Manila University
Oracare- De La Salle-College of Saint Benilde
Oracle Residences- Far Eastern University
Smart Buddy- University of the Philippines
Sunkist- De La Salle University
Discovery Suites- RP Women's Seniors Team
Xtreme Magic Sing- RP Women's Youth Team

Champions

References

Sports leagues established in 1998
Women's basketball leagues in the Philippines
1998 establishments in the Philippines
Women's basketball leagues in Asia